Rocky is a 1948 American drama film directed by Phil Karlson and starring Roddy McDowall, Edgar Barrier and Gale Sherwood. It was produced and distributed by Monogram Pictures.

Plot
Its plot mainly follows a painter named John Hammond and a dog named Rocky, the latter of which is suspected for an epidemic of sheep killings.

Production
The film was first in a series of movies McDowall agreed to make with Monogram. Filming started 10 June 1947 near Cedar City, Utah. McDowall was also associate producer. He was meant to follow it with an adaptation of Mysterious Island by Jules Verne but that was never made.

Nina Hunter was borrowed from Comet Productions to appear in the film.

Cast
 Roddy McDowall as Chris Hammond
 Edgar Barrier as John Hammond
 Nita Hunter as Kathy Forrester
 Gale Sherwood as Ellen Forrester
 Jonathan Hale as Kenneth Forrester
 William Ruhl as 	Drew
 Claire Whitney as 	Hortense
 Irving Bacon as 	Bert Hillman
 John Alvin as Jack Arnold
 Ben Corbett as 	Hanson

References

External links

Rocky at TCMDB
Rocky at BFI

1948 films
American drama films
1948 drama films
American black-and-white films
Films directed by Phil Karlson
Monogram Pictures films
1940s English-language films
1940s American films